Terry Donovan (born 27 February 1958) is a former footballer who played as a striker. Born in England, he made two appearances for the Republic of Ireland national team at international level.

Career
Donovan played for Grimsby Town, Aston Villa, Oxford United (loan), Portland Timbers, Burnley and Rotherham United during his club career and also played for Ireland's national team on two occasions.

He joined Villa for £72,000 in 1979 after establishing himself as a prolific scorer during three seasons with his hometown club Grimsby Town, helping them gain promotion from the Fourth Division. Donovan contributed two goals in Villa's 5 – 0 victory over Valur in the early stages of 1981–82 European Cup. Villa went on to win the tournament.

Personal life
Donovan attended Clee Grammar School (it became Matthew Humberstone School in 1973).

His late Irish father, Don Donovan, also represented Grimsby Town and the Republic of Ireland and managed Boston United from 1965–69. He is the father of broadcaster Keeley Donovan.

See also
 List of Republic of Ireland international footballers born outside the Republic of Ireland

References

External links
Republic of Ireland profile

Living people
1958 births
People from Tetney, Lincolnshire
English people of Irish descent
Republic of Ireland association footballers
Footballers from Liverpool
Republic of Ireland international footballers
Republic of Ireland under-21 international footballers
Association football forwards
North American Soccer League (1968–1984) players
English Football League players
Grimsby Town F.C. players
Aston Villa F.C. players
Oxford United F.C. players
Portland Timbers (1975–1982) players
Burnley F.C. players
Rotherham United F.C. players
English expatriate footballers
English expatriate sportspeople in the United States
Expatriate soccer players in the United States